Mount Frances is a  mountain summit located in the Kahiltna Glacier valley in the Alaska Range, in Denali National Park and Preserve, in the U.S. state of Alaska. It is situated north of the Kahiltna Glacier base camp for mountaineers attempting to climb Denali, Mount Foraker, or Mount Hunter. The summit of Mt. Frances is the best viewpoint from which to see all three giants from one location. Access to the area is via air taxi from Talkeetna. The mountain's name honors Frances Randall (1925-1984), the first Denali Base Camp manager for nine climbing seasons (1974-1983). She was planning a tenth season, but cancer claimed her life. Her expertise was instrumental in coordinating many rescues that saved lives and earned her the nicknames Guardian Angel of McKinley, and Kahiltna Queen. She was a member of the Fairbanks Symphony Orchestra, often playing the violin at base camp over the CB radio. In 1964 she became the sixth woman to reach the summit of Mount McKinley.

Climbing

Alpine routes at Mount Frances

 Scratch and Sniff - 
 Southwest Ridge - 
 South East Ridge -  WI2

See also

Mountain peaks of Alaska

References

External links

 Localized weather: Mountain Forecast
 Frances Randall at Denali (1977): YouTube (10 minutes in)
 Two Climbers Killed in Avalanche on Mt. Frances: NPS

Alaska Range
Mountains of Denali National Park and Preserve
Mountains of Denali Borough, Alaska
Mountains of Alaska
North American 3000 m summits